Rhyzodiastes rimoganensis is a species of ground beetle in the subfamily Rhysodinae. It was described by Yoshiro Miwa in 1934. It is endemic to Taiwan. Rhyzodiastes rimoganensis measure  in length.

References

Rhyzodiastes
Beetles described in 1934
Beetles of Asia
Insects of Taiwan
Endemic fauna of Taiwan